Love and God (also known as "Kais Aur Laila") is a 1986 Indian Hindi-language film which was the final film produced and directed by K. Asif. This film was his first and only directorial venture to be made completely in color. Through this film, the director wanted to convey the legendary love story of Laila Majnu, starring Nimmi as Laila and Sanjeev Kumar as Qais a.k.a. Majnu. Starting production in 1963, the film had a long and troubled history and was released over 23 years later in 1986.

Plot
The movie was based on the famous Arabic love story of Laila and Kais.  Kais-E-Emir (Sanjeev Kumar) is the son of Emir-E-Yemen.  Laila (Nimmi) is the daughter of Emir-E-Basra. Kais and Laila love each other since childhood. As a child, Kais was so intoxicated in his love for Laila that when his teacher asked the students to practice the word Allah in their books, Kais kept on writing the word Laila instead of Allah. Allah is the Arabic word for god. The teacher became angry and hit Kais on his palms with a stick. At the same time, Laila began to bleed from her palms. The teacher believed that this was a miracle, which proved that Laila and Kais were meant to be with each other. The lovers want to get married, but their families have hated each other since many generations. Laila and Kais meet each other in the desert on a regular basis. The people gossip about their love and Laila's name is tarnished. Her father forbids her from leaving the house. Laila's house is surrounded by armed guards and she cannot venture out to meet Kais. Kais sends a messenger pigeon to Laila. His letter tied to the pigeon's leg discloses that he is on his way to meet her at her house. Laila's father reads the message and becomes furious to see the audacity of Kais. He orders his guards to kill Kais if he ventures into their territory. Laila scared for the safety of Kais sends her maid Nauheed to forewarn Kais of the impending danger. Laila's father Emir-E-Basra goes to the house of Kais and threatens his father that if his son Kais dares to venture into his territory, he will be killed by the guards of Basra. Kais's mother sends their Abyssinian slave to rescue Kais. Kais is grievously wounded by the guards. Kais is brought home where his wounds are tended. Laila's father decides to relocate to a new city away from Kais. After a number of days, Kais's health improves and he leaves his home in search of Laila. He wanders across the deserts and practically loses his sanity. People start calling him "Majnu", meaning—a crazy obsessed lover. Laila's father forces her to marry Ign-e-Salaam. Laila refuses to allow her husband to come near her. Laila is distraught to be separated from Kais. She is comforted by Gazala, who advises her to visit a nearby dargah. It is said that if a devotee prays earnestly, the prayers would be fulfilled. A Dargah (Persian: درگاه dargâh or درگه dargah) is a Sufi Islamic shrine built over the grave of a revered religious figure, often a Sufi saint or dervish. Eventually, Laila visits the dargah where she prays with great fervor. She sees an extremely tired, sick and dying Kais outside the dargah. She embraces him and they die in each other's arms.

Cast
Sanjeev Kumar as Kais-E-Emir / Majnu
Nimmi as Laila
Simi Garewal as Ghazala 
Pran as Shehzada Ibn-E-Salaam
Amjad Khan as Kais' Servant
Nazima as Nahid
Agha as Adam
Jayant as Emir-E-Basra
Nazir Hussain as Emir-E-Yemen 
Murad as Peer-O-Mursheed
Achala Sachdev as Laila's Mother
Lalita Pawar as Kais' Mother
Randhir as Moulavi

Production
The film had a long and troubled production history with shooting starting in 1963 with Guru Dutt as Kais and Nimmi as Laila. However Guru Dutt's sudden death in 1964 left the film incomplete and it was shelved. Then, Asif recast Sanjeev Kumar as Kais and resumed production of the film in 1970. Unfortunately, the director K. Asif died on 9 March 1971 at the age of 48/49 and the film was once again left incomplete. Fifteen years later, Asif's senior widow Akhtar Asif decided to release the incomplete film with the help of producer-director-distributor K. C. Bokadia. In a few months, they managed to salvage some usable portions of the incomplete film from three different studios and pieced them together. This cut-paste incomplete version was finally released on 27 May 1986. By the time of the film's release, several of the film's cast members had died, including its leading actor Sanjeev Kumar, who died in 1985. The songs were composed by music director Naushad Ali, Dialogues by Wajahat Mirza and the lyrics were written by lyricist Khumar Barabankvi.

Soundtrack

References

Raju Bharatan (1 August 2013). "Preface". Naushadnama: The Life and Music of Naushad. Hay House, Inc. pp. 48–. . Retrieved 26 January 2015. https://books.google.com/books?id=mg09BAAAQBAJ&pg=PT89&lpg=PT89&dq=love+and+god+1986&source=bl&ots=EUb5P4m2Aj&sig=71UwqZNbrom5l0jkVAcM-7Tvky8&hl=en&sa=X&ei=7UQxVam6B8HlmAXq3oC4Cw&ved=0CE8Q6AEwCTgU#v=onepage&q=love%20and%20god%201986&f=false

External links

Films directed by K. Asif
1986 films
1980s Urdu-language films
Films scored by Naushad
1980s Hindi-language films
Urdu-language Indian films